Henry Lehr may refer to:

 Henry Solomon Lehr (1838–1923), American educator, founder of Ohio Northern University
 Henry Symes Lehr (1869-1929), American socialite